The R6 Highway is a primary road, a trunk road and regional road corridor link road in Zimbabwe.

Background

The R6 begins in Chivhu at the junction with the R1 Highway which runs from Harare to Masvingo. 
 
It ends in Nyazura at the junction with A3 Harare-Mutare Highway.

It is also known as Buhere Road because the main waypoint and halfway house is Buhera.

[Source Map: Chapter 9: Road Transport Services and Infrastructure -African: Map 9.2. Road Transport Network of Zimbabwe]

Operations

This road is the R1 link road to the R5 for traffic from Gweru to Mutare. It works in conjunction with the R7/A17 53 km from Chivhu towards Masvingo which links the R1/A4 with the R2/A5 for traffic from Mutare to Gweru.

It is tolled at Magamba Toll Plaza 17.5 km from Chivhu.

See also

 ZINARA
 Transport in Zimbabwe
 R5 Highway
 R1 Highway

References

Roads in Zimbabwe